Darreh-ye Harcheh is a village in Bibi Hakimeh Rural District, in the Central District of Gachsaran County, Kohgiluyeh and Boyer-Ahmad Province, Iran. At the 2006 census, its population was 18, in 4 families.

References 

Populated places in Gachsaran County